= Vegas Chips =

American snack food manufacturer

Vegas Chips was a snack food manufacturer based in North Las Vegas, Nevada. It was founded in 1987. The company became publicly traded on the NASDAQ in 1989. Vegas Chips was best known for its brand of kettle cooked potato chips. Milton Rudnick became president in 1991. He was founder of Jaxs Cheese Twists, a popular cheese snack in New England now owned by The Bachmann Pretzel Company. Kevin Holden succeeded Milton Rudnick as president and CEO of Vegas Chips in 1992. In 1994, the company was acquired by Pacific Snaxs of Newport Beach, CA. In 1995 Pacific Snax moved all its snack manufacturing to the Vegas Chips plant in North Las Vegas, Nevada. In 1997, Pacific Snaxs filed for Bankruptcy and was subsequently liquidated. Pacific Snaxs most popular snack item was Kettle Classics, a line of kettle cooked potato chips. The Kettle Classics line of snacks continues today under Classic Foods of Irvine, California. In 2022, Kevin Holden repurchased the Vegas Chips brand and planned to relaunch it in 2023.
